The 2013–14 Wichita B-52s season was the first season of the Wichita B-52s professional indoor soccer club. The Wichita B-52s, a Central Division team in the Professional Arena Soccer League, played their home games in the Hartman Arena in Wichita, Kansas. The team was led by team president Joseph Pindell and head coach Larry Inlow with assistant coach Jamie Harding and strength coach Todd Stranghoner.

Season summary
The B-52 struggled through their first 4 games, beating only the Illinois Piasa and giving up 43 goals with Nic Martinez as keeper. Jason Dewey was brought in as the new primary goalkeeper and over the next six games the team beat Illinois and the expansion Tulsa Revolution for a 6–7 record so far but a sharp reduction from an average of more than 10 goals surrendered per game with Martinez to an average just over 5 with Dewey guarding the net. Wichita earned a respectable 7–9 record in its inaugural season but did not qualify for the Ron Newman Cup playoffs. The team performed well at the box office, drawing an average of 1,650 fans per game, placing them 6th in the 20-team league for average attendance.

The Wichita B-52s participated in the 2013–14 United States Open Cup for Arena Soccer, starting with a Round of 32 victory over the Denver Dynamite of the Premier Arena Soccer League on December 28, 2013, to advance. The B-52s' regular season January 25 victory over the Tulsa Revolution on January 25 served as the Round of 16 match for both clubs. Wichita hosted Chicago Mustangs on February 1 for a combined regular season and Open Cup Quarter-finals match and lost 5–10, ending Wichita's run in the tournament.

History
This franchise fills a gap left when the second Wichita Wings of the Major Indoor Soccer League folded in 2013. The B-52s' team colors are based on the Wings' team colors.

Off-field moves
The team's games are broadcast locally by KGSO (1410 AM, "Sports Radio 1410") and over the internet via America One Sports.

The team organized a series of holiday events for December 2013. These included players collecting for the Salvation Army on December 12, a "happy holidays" themed game against the Tulsa Revolution on December 14, plus a holiday celebration including player autographs and a visit from Santa Claus on December 16.

Awards and honors
The B-52s honored Kim Røntved, a former defensive star for the original Wichita Wings, during their final regular season game on February 9. Røntved was inducted into the Indoor Soccer Hall of Fame during a halftime ceremony featuring former Wings coach Roy Turner and ISHOF Executive Director Sydney Nusinov.

Schedule

Regular season

† Game also counts for US Open Cup, as listed in chart below.
♥ Postponed from December 7 due to extreme winter weather

U.S. Open Cup for Arena Soccer

References

External links
Wichita B-52s official website
Wichita B-52s at The Wichita Eagle
Wichita B-52s at The Newton Kansan

Wichita B-52s
Wichita B-52s
B-52s 2013
Wichita B-52s 2013
Wichita B-52s 2013